Nadras Prasad (born 31 July 1985) is an Indian cricketer. He made his first-class debut for Badureliya Sports Club in the 2017–18 Premier League Tournament on 6 January 2018.

References

External links
 

1985 births
Living people
Indian cricketers
Badureliya Sports Club cricketers
Place of birth missing (living people)